The Public Utility Vehicle Modernization Program (PUVMP) was launched by the Department of Transportation of the Philippines in 2017, with the goal of making the country's public transportation system efficient and environmentally friendly by 2020. The program calls for the phasing-out of jeepneys, buses and other Public Utility Vehicles (PUVs) that are at least 15 years old and replacing them with safer, more comfortable and more environmentally-friendly alternatives over the next three years. Currently, there are 220,000 jeepney units operating throughout the country.

Replacement vehicles are required to have at least a Euro 4-compliant engine or an electric engine to lessen pollution. Some proposed requirements include CCTV cameras, an automated fare collection system, speed limiters and GPS monitors.

The Land Bank of the Philippines estimates that each jeepney replacement will cost around ₱1.4 million to ₱1.6 million. However, based on an interest rate of 6% per annum and a payment period of 7 years, the actual cost of a jeepney reaches ₱2.1 million.

While reception among the general populace have been positive, some transport groups have criticized the program as it might lead to losses of jobs and businesses.

Goals 

The program aims to change the current franchising system, revise and introduce new routes and provide education to jeepney drivers.

The program, according to the DOTr, has the following goals:
Safe and comfy transport
Reliable travel time
Disciplined and competent drivers
Fair regulations
Spacious jeepneys
Moreover, the government believes that the program's environmental and economic benefits would be felt by commuters, operators, and drivers alike: commuters will profit from the changes in routes and optimized networks. Because of the reduced traffic congestion and pollution, drivers will have higher monthly pay and benefits, as well as better health. Finally, with less traffic, operators will be able to take more passengers and save money under the franchising plan by pooling services.

Implementation 

The Omnibus Franchising Guidelines (OFG) were signed by Transportation Secretary Arthur Tugade in June 2017, and they altered the process of issuing jeepney franchises by implementing new route planning criteria and establishing new vehicle and driver standards.

Under the OFG, Local Government Units are required to come up with their own Local Public Transport Route Plans.

These plans will be based on existing and projected travel patterns and will be considered by the Land Transportation Franchising and Regulatory Board in issuing new franchises. Single-unit operators will no longer be granted franchises.

Crackdown on dilapidated vehicles 
In January 2018, Metro Manila's Inter-Agency Council on Traffic (i-ACT) launched operation 'Tanggal Bulok, Tanggal Usok', targeting vehicles for environmental and safety violations such as smoke belching, worn out tires and lack of seat belts. As of January 23, a total of 1087 vehicles, mostly Public Utility Jeepneys (PUJs), were flagged down, apprehended and issued summons. To accommodate affected passengers, the Armed Forces of the Philippines have been offering free rides.

Prototypes 
In October 2017, the Land Transportation Franchising and Regulatory Board (LTFRB) and the Department of Trade and Industry (DTI) presented sixteen prototype jeepneys. These models were all locally manufactured and based on guidelines set by the DOTr. Features include:
Euro 4 engines
CCTV Cameras
GPS
Automated fare collection systems
Front-facing seats
New exits on the right-hand side

Financing 
An estimated ₱1.5 billion will be given to transport corporations and cooperatives to purchase new PUVs through the Development Bank of the Philippines' Program assistance to Support Alternative Driving Approaches (PASADA). The program will feature a 5-percent equity for vehicle purchase, 6-percent interest rate and seven-year repayment period.

Under PASADA, a maximum of 95 percent of the cost of the vehicle, and a maximum of 75 percent of the cost of the support facilities comprise the total loan per borrower. The government will also offer a maximum subsidy of ₱80,000 to cover the equity payment.

A Memorandum of Understanding (MOU) with the Land Bank of the Philippines was also signed by the DOTr to set up a ₱1 billion financing for PUJs via the Special Environment-Friendly and Efficiently Driven (SPEED) Jeepney Program.

Phases 
According to the DOTr, the proposed implementation time frame is as follows:
 Q4 2017 Pilot program in Metro Manila
 2018–2019 Metro Manila, Metro Cebu, Metro Davao
 2019–2020 Highly Urbanized Cities, Rest of the Country

Reception

Support 
At least twenty government agencies and twenty-four transport groups from across the country supported the launch of the program. Among transport groups that supported the initiative are the Panta Transportation Network, Federation of Jeepney Operators and Drivers Association (FEJODAP), 1-United Transport Koalisyon (1-UTAK), Alliance of Transport Operators and Drivers Association of the Philippines (ALTODAP), and Coalition of Operators, Drivers, Employees, Atbp. (CODE-X), and the Philippine Confederation of Drivers and Operators – Alliance of Concerned Transport Organizations (PCDO-ACTO). Pangkalahatang Sanggunian Manila & Suburbs Drivers Association (PASANG-MASDA) also expressed support. Their president Obet Martin stated, "it was high time for the country to replace the current jeepneys to more modern and more efficient units".

A 2019 study also showed that majority of commuters prefer to ride an e-jeepney than a conventional jeepney in areas where it is available, as it provides a safer, environment-friendly, and more comfortable ride.

Criticism 

Even before its launch, the program was received negatively by various transport groups. While Senate Bill 1284 and House Bill 4334, the program's enabling legislation, were still pending in February 2017, some jeepney drivers launched numerous strikes and demonstrations in Metro Manila and in key cities throughout the country.

According to Kilusang Mayo Uno (KMU) and Pinagkaisang Samahan ng Tsuper and Opereytor Nationwide (PISTON), the ₱1.4 million to ₱1.6 million cost of new jeepneys will adversely affect the livelihood of 600,000 public utility jeepney (PUJ) drivers and 300,000 small operators. For, drivers, operators, and other transport stakeholders, the modernization may result in possible losses of jobs and businesses. The group claims that commuters will also be hit with an increased fare of at least ₱20.

Cooperative Development Authority has noted that jeepney driver-operator groups have not been included in technical working groups for the jeepney modernization program. Vice President Leni Robredo said jeepney drivers and operators, as well as the riding public, should be allowed to take part in public consultations regarding the program.

Senator Grace Poe, chair of the Senate public services committee, has expressed doubt over the governments readiness to implement the program nationwide. According to Poe, the government will have to shell out ₱415 billion for full implementation of the scheme, far more than the ₱2.26 billion it approved. She has suggested that the PUV Modernization Program be implemented in select cities instead.

Senator Poe and Senate Majority Leader Vicente “Tito” Sotto III have called for a "middle ground" solution, saying that old but road worthy PUVs should be allowed to operate. However, the DOTr has given no clear commitment to their suggestion. Senator Franklin Drilon criticized the program's mismanagement and "hodge-podge planning".

In the House of Representatives, Representative Sarah Elago noted how the program displaces single franchise owners, owing to provisions in the law requiring franchises to own a minimum of 20 units, amounting to P7 million of capital. Another youth group, Student Christian Movement of the Philippines (SCMP), slammed President Duterte on Independence Day 2021 as a "puppet" enforcing neoliberal policies such as jeepney phaseout.

Protests 

The transport group Stop and Go Coalition held a strike on September 24, 2017. On October 16 and 17, PISTON held a two-day transportation strike. In a press statement, Alliance of Concerned Transport Organizations President Efren de Luna stated that their group did not join the transport strike as they found that PUV modernization wants to ensure the security of passengers and to have an environmentally sustainable mode of transportation.

See also

 Transportation in the Philippines
 Jeepney
 Taxicabs of the Philippines

References 

Share taxis
Public transportation in the Philippines
Road transportation in the Philippines
Decorated vehicles
Duterte administration controversies
2018 controversies
2019 controversies